1994 in television may refer to:

1994 in American television
1994 in Australian television
1994 in Belgian television
1994 in Brazilian television
1994 in British television
1994 in Canadian television
1994 in Chinese television
1994 in Croatian television
1994 in Danish television
1994 in Dutch television
1994 in Estonian television
1994 in Greek television
1994 in Hong Kong TVB television
1994 in Irish television
1994 in Italian television
1994 in Japanese television
1994 in New Zealand television
1994 in Norwegian television
1994 in Philippine television
1994 in Polish television
1994 in Portuguese television
1994 in Scottish television
1994 in South African television
1994 in South Korean television
1994 in Swedish television
1994 in Thai television